Antonio Sánchez Navarro (born 22 April 1997) is a Spanish professional footballer who plays for RCD Mallorca as a central midfielder.

Club career
Born in Palma, Majorca, Balearic Islands, Sánchez represented RCD Mallorca as a youth. In August 2016, after finishing his formation, he was loaned to Tercera División side UD Poblense for one year.

Sánchez made his senior debut on 20 August 2016, starting in a 3–1 away win against UD Rotlet Molinar. He scored his first goal on 29 October in a 2–1 win at CF Platges de Calvià, and scored a brace in a 6–2 home routing of Rotlet on 17 December.

Sánchez returned to Mallorca in July 2017, being assigned to the reserves now also in the fourth division. The following 7 March, he renewed his contract until 2020, and joined Segunda División B side Barakaldo CF on loan on 17 July 2018.

On 30 August 2019, Sánchez joined Segunda División side CD Mirandés on a one-year loan deal. He made his professional debut on 8 September, starting in a 2–1 home win against Real Oviedo.

Sánchez scored his first professional goal on 14 December 2019, netting the second in a 2–0 home defeat of SD Huesca. Upon returning to the Bermellones the following August, he became a regular starter and scored three goals in 35 league appearances as the club achieved promotion to La Liga.

Sánchez made his top tier debut on 22 September 2021, replacing Aleix Febas in a 1–6 away loss against Real Madrid. His first goal in the category occurred on 27 October, as he scored the opener in a 1–1 home draw against Sevilla FC.

Career statistics

Club

References

External links
Profile at the RCD Mallorca website

1997 births
Living people
Footballers from Palma de Mallorca
Spanish footballers
Association football midfielders
La Liga players
Segunda División players
Segunda División B players
Tercera División players
RCD Mallorca B players
UD Poblense players
Barakaldo CF footballers
RCD Mallorca players
CD Mirandés footballers